Tianguangdao (天光道 "Way of the Heavenly Light") is a Chinese folk religious sect that as of the 1980s was a proscribed religion in China. Particularly active in Heilongjiang and Anhui, there are records of detentions of leaders and members easpecially from the former province.

History
Wang Xianyao, a school teacher who became a leader of the Tianguangdao, was arrested in Heilongjiang in the early 1980s. His fate is unknown. According to official report, he was a teacher at the Xingtong Middle School of Wanjinshan Commune in Baode County. At the time of the arrest he was 32 years old and college-educated.

Zhang Desheng, another Tianguangdao leader, was arrested in Baoqing County of Heilongjiang in the 1980s. In Anhui the sect instituted a system of financial rewarding for every member who would have converted new people.

See also
 Chinese salvationist religions

References

Sources
 
 List first published in: 

Chinese salvationist religions